RTJ4 is the fourth studio album by American hip hop duo Run the Jewels. It was released digitally through their own Jewel Runners imprint via BMG Rights Management on June 3, 2020, two days earlier than scheduled, with physical editions released in September 2020. As with their previous albums, a download of the album is available for free through their website, with the option of paying for it via other digital providers. The album features guest appearances from Greg Nice, DJ Premier, 2 Chainz, Pharrell Williams, Mavis Staples, Josh Homme, and frequent collaborator Zack de la Rocha.

RTJ4 received widespread acclaim from critics and debuted at number 10 on the US Billboard 200, their first top 10 album on the chart. The album was supported by three singles: "Yankee and the Brave (Ep. 4)", "Ooh La La", and "Just".

Background
The album was first announced on October 11, 2018, with the release of the non-album single "Let's Go (The Royal We)", which was featured in the 2018 superhero film Venom and debuted on Zane Lowe's Beats 1 show.

Release
The original album release date was June 5, 2020. Due to the ongoing protests against police brutality sparked by the murders of George Floyd and Ahmaud Arbery, and the shooting of Breonna Taylor, the duo decided to release it two days early. The accompanying note read:

Promotion
The album's first single, "Yankee and the Brave (Ep. 4)", was released on March 22, 2020. The album's second single, "Ooh La La" featuring Greg Nice and DJ Premier, was released on March 25, three days later. The music video for "Ooh La La" was released on April 27, 2020. In collaboration with "Ooh La La", the duo announced a cannabis strain of the same name. "Just" featuring Pharrell Williams and Zack de la Rocha, was sent to alternative radio as the third single on June 14, 2020.

Critical reception

RTJ4 was met with widespread critical acclaim. At Metacritic, which assigns a normalized rating out of 100 to reviews from professional publications, the album received an average score of 89, based on 26 reviews. Aggregator AnyDecentMusic? gave it 8.8 out of 10, based on their assessment of the critical consensus.

Will Lavin of NME praised the album, stating, "Easily Mike and El-P's best work to date, RTJ4 is protest music for a new generation; they're armed in the uprising with a torrent of spirited rallying calls". Reviewing the album for Rolling Stone, Jon Dolan stated, "RTJ4, which the band rush-released a few days ahead of schedule, is laser-focused. [...] Mike unloads on racist cops, systemic poverty, corporate media, and other eternal enemies. But the album never feels preachy, because the music bounces as much as it brays, with an elastic flow and deep history". Jack Bray of The Line of Best Fit wrote, "RTJ4 is Killer Mike & El-P's masterstroke. This is musical evolution for moral, social and political revolution, the group now creating anthems in the pursuit of tolerance, respect and unity". Channing Freeman from Sputnikmusic also enjoyed the album, saying, "As is typical on Run the Jewels albums, every feature is perfectly placed, but the inclusion of Mavis Staples and Josh Homme may be El-P's finest production moment yet. Homme's ghostly wailing and questing guitar provide a backdrop for Staples to sing an image that perfectly distills not only RTJ's oeuvre but the bloody centuries of America's history". For Pitchfork, Sheldon Pearce wrote that "RTJ4 centers protest music less explicitly than RTJ3 did, but the moments when the album is most pronouncedly in active revolt are still when it feels most essential".

Neil Z. Yeung of AllMusic gave a positive review, stating, "RTJ4 distills the anger and frustration of the people through Run the Jewels' hard-hitting, no-nonsense revolution anthems. Trim with no filler, this fourth set from the outspoken duo provides relevant history lessons that are more useful than a classroom textbook". Exclaim! critic Kyle Mullin said of El-P, "The New York rapper-producer's greatest contribution to RTJ4 is his vivid and varied sonic backdrops. His on-point production offers the lyrically superior Killer Mike both space and sonic support as he rises to new heights of artistry and activism, making El-P the kind of ally worth emulating". Mike Milenko of Clash said, "RTJ4 is a must listen. It is diverse enough to appeal to even the hardest crowds. Many genres are represented here, but lyrical hip-hop is at the forefront of all that Run the Jewels is. They stand out from the crowd, whilst invoking the people to stand up for themselves. There is not a bad song on the entire album and the production and features are second to none".

In his Substack-published "Consumer Guide" column, Robert Christgau assigned the album an 'A+' grade and applauded the "vigor" of the duo's political direction and the lyrics as their "sharpest" yet, while declaring, "With trap on its opiated treadmill, the gangsta sonics that power El-P and Killer Mike's inchoate aggressiveness will feel tonic to anyone with both an appetite for music and a political pulse".

Year-end lists

Commercial performance
RTJ4 debuted at number 10 on the US Billboard 200 with 38,000 album-equivalent units (including 30,000 pure album sales) from just two days of tracking, marking the duo's first top 10 album on the chart.

Track listing
All tracks are produced by El-P, and co-produced by Little Shalimar and Wilder Zoby, except where noted.

Notes
  signifies a co-producer
  signifies an additional producer
 Track stylizations:
 "Just" is stylized "JU$T"
 "Goonies vs. E.T." is stylized "goonies vs. E.T."
 All other track titles are stylized in all lowercase
 "A Few Words for the Firing Squad (Radiation)" includes the hidden track "Theme Music", listed in the album's liner notes as a separate track with identical credits.

Samples
  "Ooh La La" contains elements and a sample of "DWYCK", written by Keith Elam, Christopher Martin, Greg Mays, and Darryl Barnes, and performed by Gang Starr featuring Nice & Smooth.
  "Out of Sight" contains elements and a sample of "Misdemeanor", written by Leon Sylvers III and performed by Foster Sylvers.
  "The Ground Below" contains elements of "Ether", written by David Allen, Hugo Burnham, Andrew Gill, and Jonathan King, as performed by Gang of Four.

Personnel
Credits are adapted from the album's digital booklet and Tidal.

Run the Jewels
 El-P – vocals (all tracks), additional string arrangements (11), executive producer, art direction
 Killer Mike – vocals (all tracks)

Musicians

 Trackstar the DJ – scratching (1, 3, 4, 8)
 David Ferguson – additional vocals (1)
 DJ Premier – scratches (2)
 2 Chainz – vocals (3)
 Cutty Ranks – instruments (4)
 Z-Kicks – vocals (4)
 Theron "Uptown AP" Thomas – additional vocals (4)
 Kaushlesh "Garry" Purohit – tabla (4)
 Stuart Bogie – tenor saxophone (5)
 Cutmaster Swiff – scratches (5)
 Gangsta Boo – vocals (6)
 Pharrell Williams – vocals (7)
 Zack de la Rocha – vocals (7)
 Nicholas Ryan Gant – additional vocals (7)
 Mr. Muthafuckin' eXquire – vocals (8)
 Josh Homme – vocals, instruments (10)
 Mavis Staples – vocals (10)
 Matt Sweeney – guitar, additional vocals (11)
 ASAP Ferg – additional vocals (11)
 Jeremy Wilms – string arrangements (11)
 Dana Lyn – violin (11)
 Danton Boller – bass (11)
 Cochemea Gastelum – tenor saxophone (11)

Technical

 Joey Raia – mixing engineer
 Joe LaPorta – mastering engineer
 Nick Hook – recording engineer
 Leon Kelly – recording engineer
 Kaushlesh "Garry" Purohit – recording engineer (1, 3–11)
 Carl Bespolka – recording engineer (2–11)
 Taylor Jackson – recording engineer (3–11)
 Dylan Neustadter – recording engineer (3–11)
 Mat LeJeune – assistant recording engineer (3–11)
 Jonathan Lackey – assistant recording engineer (3–11)

Artwork
 Tim Saccenti – art direction, photography
 Smartbomb.net – layout, design
 Nick Gazin – lettering, font design

Charts

Release history

Notes

References

2020 albums
Albums produced by El-P
Run the Jewels albums
RBC Records albums
Albums free for download by copyright owner
BMG Rights Management albums
Albums recorded at Shangri-La (recording studio)
Hip hop albums by American artists